× Brassolaeliocattleya, abbreviated Blc. in the horticultural trade, is the orchid nothogenus for intergeneric hybrid greges containing at least one ancestor species from each of the three ancestral genera Brassavola R.Br., Cattleya Lindl. and Laelia Lindl., and from no other genera.

Nomenclatural history 
As the name was used in 1999, there were many greges which were among the most spectacular of cultivated orchids, being particularly valued for the large showy labellum. By 2009, the "Brassavola" parents most commonly used in producing × Brassolaeliocattleya hybrids had been moved into the genus Rhyncholaelia, and the "Laelia" parents most commonly used in producing × Brassolaeliocattleya hybrids had been moved into the genus Cattleya. As a result, most of the greges that were classified as × Brassolaeliocattleya in 1999 are now classified in the nothogenus × Rhyncholaeliocattleya, although others are now placed in several nothogenera:

References 

Orchid nothogenera
Laeliinae